NOS4A2 (pronounced Nosferatu) is an American supernatural horror drama television series, based on the 2013 novel of the same name by Joe Hill, that ran on AMC from June 2, 2019 to August 23, 2020. The series was created by Jami O'Brien and stars Ashleigh Cummings, Zachary Quinto, Jahkara Smith, Ólafur Darri Ólafsson, Virginia Kull, and Ebon Moss-Bachrach. The series deals with a working-class artist who uses supernatural abilities to track an immortal being who preys on children. In August 2020, the series was canceled after two seasons after completing the storyline presented in the original novel.

Premise
NOS4A2 follows Victoria "Vic" McQueen, a young working-class artist who discovers that she has a supernatural ability to track the seemingly immortal Charlie Manx. Manx feeds on the souls of children, then deposits what remains of them into Christmasland—a twisted Christmas Village of Manx's imagination where every day is Christmas Day and unhappiness is against the law. Vic must strive to defeat Manx and rescue his victims—without losing her mind or falling victim to him herself.

Cast and characters

Main
 Ashleigh Cummings as Victoria "Vic" McQueen
 Ólafur Darri Ólafsson as Bing Partridge
 Jahkara J. Smith as Margaret "Maggie" Leigh
 Ebon Moss-Bachrach as Christopher "Chris" McQueen
 Virginia Kull as Linda McQueen
 Zachary Quinto as Charlie Manx
 Ashley Romans as Tabitha Hutter (recurring season 1; main season 2)
 Jonathan Langdon as Lou Carmody (guest star season 1; main season 2)
 Mattea Conforti as Millie Manx (recurring season 1; main season 2)

Recurring
 Dalton Harrod as Craig
 Asher Miles Fallica as Daniel Moore
 Chris McKinney as Sheriff Bly
 Rarmian Newton as Drew Butler
 Karen Pittman as Angela Brewster
 Paulina Singer as Willa Brewster
 Darby Camp as Haley Smith (season 1)
 Judith Roberts as Jolene
 Jason David as Bruce Wayne McQueen (season 2)
 Paul Schneider as Jonathan Beckett, the "Hourglass Man" (season 2)

Episodes

Season 1 (2019)
The complete season became available on June 2, 2019, via AMC's on-demand service, AMC Premiere.

Season 2 (2020)

Production

Development
On December 8, 2015, it was announced that AMC had put a television series adaptation of Joe Hill's novel NOS4A2 into development. It was reported that a search was underway for a writer to pen the adaptation. Production companies involved in the series were set to include The Tornante Company and AMC Studios. On May 31, 2017, it was announced that AMC had opened a writers room for the series. Jami O'Brien led the writers room and executive produced alongside Hill.

On April 10, 2018, it was announced that AMC had given the production a series order for a first season consisting of ten episodes. Additionally, it was reported that O'Brien would serve as showrunner and that Lauren Corrao would be an executive producer.

Though the series is set in Haverhill, Massachusetts, it was filmed in various locations in Rhode Island, including the Cranston Street Armory.

On March 30, 2019, it was announced that the series would premiere on June 2, 2019.

On July 20, 2019, while at San Diego Comic-Con it was announced that AMC had renewed the series for a second season. The second season finished filming in January 2020 and premiered on June 21, 2020. Ratings saw a massive drop during season two, running at about half what they were during season one. On August 31, 2020, AMC canceled the series after two seasons and adapting the entire storyline of the original novel.

Casting
On June 27, 2018, it was announced that Ólafur Darri Ólafsson, Virginia Kull, and Ebon Moss-Bachrach had been cast in main roles. On July 5, 2018, it was reported that Jahkara Smith had joined the cast in a recurring capacity. On August 28, 2018, it was announced that Karen Pittman had been cast in a recurring role. On September 13, 2018, it was reported that Zachary Quinto and Ashleigh Cummings had been cast in the series' two lead roles of Charlie Manx and Vic McQueen, respectively. On October 12, 2018, it was announced that Rarmian Newton and Darby Camp had joined the cast in a recurring capacity. On December 17, 2018, it was reported that Ashley Romans would appear in a recurring role.

Release

Marketing
On December 20, 2018, a promotional image from the series was released featuring Zachary Quinto in character as Charlie Manx.

Premiere
The series held its world premiere during the 2019 South by Southwest film festival in Austin, Texas, in March 2019, as a part of the festival's "Episodic Premieres" series of screenings. The first episode premiered on AMC on June 2, 2019. While AMC broadcast the episodes over a nine-week period, it made the entire series available for online streaming immediately on its AMC Premiere platform.

Reception

Critical response
For the first season, review aggregator website Rotten Tomatoes reported a 69% approval rating with an average score of 6.6/10, based on 29 reviews. The website's critical consensus reads, "Though Nos4a2 strains to build the necessary atmosphere to pull off its ambitious premise, it does capture the spirit of Joe Hill's singular work and provides a new psychopath for Zachary Quinto to sink his teeth into." Metacritic, which uses a weighted average, assigned a score of 47 out of 100 based on nine critics, indicating "mixed or average reviews".

For the second season, review aggregator website Rotten Tomatoes reported a 75% approval rating with an average score of 5.37/10, based on 8 reviews.

Ratings

Season 1

Season 2

Accolades

See also
 List of Christmas films

References

External links
 

2010s American drama television series
2010s American horror television series
2010s American supernatural television series
2020s American drama television series
2020s American horror television series
2020s American supernatural television series
2019 American television series debuts
2020 American television series endings
Christmas television series
English-language television shows
Horror drama television series
AMC (TV channel) original programming
Television series by The Tornante Company
Television shows based on American novels
Vampires in television
Television shows set in Colorado
Television shows set in Iowa
Television shows set in Massachusetts
Television shows filmed in Rhode Island